Samtse District (Dzongkha: བསམ་རྩེ་རྫོང་ཁག་; Wylie: Bsam-rtse rdzong-khag; older spelling "Samchi") is one of the 20 dzongkhags (districts) comprising Bhutan. It comprises two subdistricts (dungkhags): Tashicholing and Dophuchen. They are further subdivided into 15 gewogs (village blocks). The Samtse district covers a total area of 1304 sq km.

History and culture
Historically, Samtse was sparsely populated as the mountain-dwelling Bhutanese considered the low-lying district to be prone to tropical disease. During the early 20th century, the district experienced a large influx of Nepali people who were invited to the area to assist in forest-clearing. Overall, the district population has been increasing, and there have been housing shortages in Samtse as reported by Kuensel.

Samtse is also home to the Lhop (Doya) people, a little-studied ethnic group of approximately 2,500 persons. The Bhutanese believe them to be the aboriginals who predated the Tibetan migration from the north. The Lhop are noted for their animistic religious beliefs, their practice of marrying cross-cousins, and their unique burial customs.

Samtse is also well known historically for being the home of the Gurung Kazi Family who governed the region in the early 1900s till the 1960s.

Languages
The dominant language in Samtse District is Lhotshampkha, spoken by the heterogeneous Lhotshampa community, though speakers of Dzongkha, the national language, inhabit the district's eastern reaches. Samtse is also home to some of the autochthonous communities of Bhutan, pre-dating the arrival of Nepali and Dzongkha speakers. Lepcha is spoken by some 2,000 people in northeastern Samtse, and Lhokpu is spoken by some 2,500 people along the border with Chukha District.

Economy and education
Samtse has an abundance of natural deposits of talc, dolomite and other resources which are exported on a regular basis. It also houses a number of  industrial and manufacturing units.  Cardamom, ginger, areca nut, and oranges are the predominant cash crops, although most farmers practice subsistence farming.
Out of the many gewogs of Bhutan, Bara gewog has the largest cardamom growing areas. In 2010 the production is very high. 2010 prices were very high compared to past years.

Samtse is the site of one of the two campuses of the National Institute of Education, now known as Samtse College of Education, a college for teachers part of the Royal University of Bhutan system. This training Institute offers B.Ed (for secondary as well as primary), PgDE courses, and M.Ed in Science and Counselling.

Geography
With an area of approximately 1500 sq. kilometers, Samtse District is a little more than twice the size of Singapore.  It shares an international border with the Indian states of Sikkim to the west and West Bengal to the south, and internal borders with Haa and Chukha Districts.

Administrative divisions
Samtse District is divided into fifteen village blocks (or gewogs):

Dungtoe Gewog
Dophoogchen Gewog
Duenchukha Gewog
Namgaychhoeling Gewog
Norbugang Gewog
Norgaygang Gewog
Pemaling Gewog
Phuentshogpelri Gewog
Samtse Gewog
Sangngagchhoeling Gewog
Tading Gewog
Tashicholing Gewog
Tendu Gewog
Ugentse Gewog
Yoeseltse Gewog

Unlike most other districts, Samtse, along with Chukha, contain no protected areas of Bhutan. Although much of southern Bhutan contained protected areas in the 1960s, park-level environmental protection became untenable.

See also
Districts of Bhutan
Paro Province

References

 
Districts of Bhutan